Cindy Alisha (born December 12, 1985) is a Malaysian actress and TV host. She is known for portraying Mindy - the school reporter in Disney's Waktu Rehat.

References
.cindyalisha.blogspot.com

Living people
1985 births
Cindy Alisha
21st-century Malaysian actresses